Rev. Paul O'Brien (1763–1820) was an Irish language scholar and Catholic priest. He was the first Professor of Irish at St. Patrick's College, Maynooth, serving from 1802 until his death.

Born in 1763, from Cormeen, Co. Meath, O'Brien was a great grand nephew of Turlough O'Carolan.

In 1807 O'Brien was instrumental in establishing The Gaelic Society of Dublin along with Dr. John Lanigan, Edward O'Reilly, William Halliday, and Theophilus O'Flanagan. Professor O'Brien was also involved in Iberno-Celtic Society another initiative to promote the Irish Language.

Publications
 A Practical Grammar of the Irish Language by Paul O'Brien (1809).

References

1763 births
1820 deaths
18th-century Irish historians
19th-century Irish historians
18th-century Irish Roman Catholic priests
Irish writers
19th-century Irish Roman Catholic priests
People from County Meath